Fangxiang is a town in Hanjiang District, Yangzhou, Jiangsu, China. , it administers two residential neighborhoods (Fangxiang and Huangjue), and the following eighteen villages:
Fangxiang Village
Sanliqiao Village
Huacheng Village
Kaiyang Village
Xianjin Village
Qianchong Village
Caozhuang Village
Chenhua Village
Zhengda Village
Xingwan Village
Miaotou Village
Yijia Village
Gongnong Village
Heyu Village
Limin Village
Lianhe Village
Zhuyu Village
Yanhu Village

References

Township-level divisions of Jiangsu
Hanjiang District, Yangzhou